Sons of the Clouds: The Last Colony is a 2012 Spanish documentary film about people living in refugee camps in the Western Sahara. It is directed by Francisco Álvaro Longoria.
In 2013 it received a Goya Award for Best Documentary.

Cast 
Javier Bardem - Narrator
Elena Anaya - Self (voice)
Carlos Bardem - Self
Lilly Hartley - Self

References

External links 
 
 

Spanish documentary films
2012 films
Goya Award winners
2010s Spanish films